The Museo Nacional de Costa Rica is the national museum of Costa Rica, located in the capital of San José. It is located at Calle 17, between Central and Second Avenue, Cuesta de Moras. It moved to its current location in 1950.

Gallery

See also 

 List of museums in Costa Rica
 Museo del Jade Marco Fidel Tristán Castro
 Museo del Oro Precolombino

References

External links 

 
 Official Facebook Page

 Museums in San José, Costa Rica
Costa Rica
 Museums established in 1887